Azurá Breeona Stevens (born February 1, 1996) is an American professional basketball player for the Los Angeles Sparks of the Women’s National Basketball Association (WNBA). Stevens played collegiately for the Duke Blue Devils and the Connecticut Huskies. She was drafted with the 6th overall pick in the 2018 WNBA draft by the Dallas Wings.

Background 
Stevens was born in Pawtucket, Rhode Island, the daughter of Damon and Kaasha Stevens. She attended Cary High School in Cary, North Carolina, graduating in 2014. She played basketball at Cary High, where she averaged 30 points, 20 rebounds, and four blocks her senior year.  As a sophomore and junior in high school, she played basketball with The Miracle League of the Triangle. 

Stevens was an All-Academic selection all four years of high school. Her senior year, she was selected as an All-American by Parade Magazine. In 2014, she was selected for All-State by the Associated Press and for All-North Carolina First Team by USA Today.

Career

College career 
Stevens played for the Duke Blue Devils during the 2014–15 and 2015-16 season. At Duke, she was named to the All-ACC Second Team as a freshman and to the First Team as a sophomore. She sat out the following due to transfer rules before playing for the UConn Huskies in the 2017-18 season. At UConn, she was named to the All-AAC Second Team and received the AAC Sixth Player of Year and AAC Newcomer of Year awards.

Duke and Connecticut statistics

Source

WNBA career 
In April 2018, Stevens decided to forgo her senior year of college and declare for the 2018 WNBA draft. She was a highly rated player expected to be taken in the first round of the draft, and noted for her ability to play "positionless" basketball.

In her rookie season for the Wings, Stevens mostly came off the bench, averaging 20.6 minutes, 8.9 points, and 4.6 rebounds per game, and was named to the WNBA All-Rookie Team. Although the Wings ended the season with a 15–19 losing record, they entered the playoffs as the eighth seed and lost in the first round to the Phoenix Mercury. Stevens missed most of the 2019 season with an injury, playing only 9 games where she averaged 16 minutes and 4.8 points per game. She later had surgery on her injured foot.

Ahead of the 2020 season, the Wings traded Stevens to the Chicago Sky in exchange for Katie Lou Samuelson and first-round pick in the 2021 WNBA draft. In reporting ahead of the 2018 draft, multiple outlets had expected the Sky to draft Stevens with the third or fourth pick. With the Sky, Stevens was expected to fill a gap in the forward position created by the departure of Astou Ndour.

Overseas 
On 3 August 2022, she signed with Galatasaray of the Turkish Women's Basketball Super League (TKBL).

Career statistics

WNBA

Regular season 

|-
| style='text-align:left;'|2018
| style='text-align:left;'|Dallas
| 34 || 9 || 20.6 || .430 || .318 || .788 || 4.6 || 1.3 || 0.9 || 1.1 || 1.5 || 8.9
|-
| style='text-align:left;'|2019
| style='text-align:left;'|Dallas
| 9 || 1 || 16.0 || .358 || .111 || .800 || 3.6 || 0.6 || 0.6 || 1.1 || 1.0 || 4.8
|-
| style='text-align:left;'|2020
| style='text-align:left;'|Chicago
| 13|| 13 || 27.3 || .500 || .385 || .850 || 5.9 || 1.5 || 0.9 || 1.8 || 1.5 || 11.5
|-
| style="text-align:left;background:#afe6ba;"|2021
| style='text-align:left;'|Chicago
| 30 || 11 || 19.6 || .500 || .333 || .813 || '4.6 || 0.8 || 0.8 || 0.7 || 0.9 || 7.4
|-
| style='text-align:left;'|2022
| style='text-align:left;'|Chicago
| 35 || 8 || 21.9 || .472 || .362 || .744 || 3.9 || 0.8 || 0.5 || 1.1 || 0.7 || 10.6
|-
| style="text-align:left;"| Career
| style="text-align:left;"| 5 years, 2 teams
| 121 || 42 || 21.1 || .463 || .340 || .790 || 4.4 || 1.0 || 0.7 || 1.1 || 1.1 || 9.0

Playoffs 

|-
| style="text-align:left;"| 2018
| style="text-align:left;"| Dallas
| 1 || 0 || 13.0 || 1.000 || 1.000 || .000 || 2.0 || 0.0 || 0.0 || 0.0 || 0.0 || 7.0
|-
| style="text-align:left;background:#afe6ba;"| 2021
| style="text-align:left;"| Chicago
| 10 || 10 || 25.4 || .477 || .263 || .786 || 6.9 || 0.8 || 0.7 || 0.8 || 0.9 || 9.8
|-
| style="text-align:left;"| 2022
| style="text-align:left;"| Chicago
| 8 || 0 || 18.8 || .472 || .188 || .667 || 3.8 || 0.5 || 1.0 || 0.9 || 0.8 || 7.4
|-
| style="text-align:left;"| Career
| style="text-align:left;"| 3 years, 2 teams
| 19 || 10 || 21.9 || .486 || .250 || .739 || 5.3 || 0.6 || 0.8 || 0.8 || 0.8 || 8.6

Notes

External links
 Career statistics and player information from WNBA.com and Basketball-Reference.com
 UConn Huskies bio

1996 births
Living people
American expatriate basketball people in China
American women's basketball players
Basketball players from North Carolina
Basketball players from Rhode Island
Centers (basketball)
Chicago Sky players
Dallas Wings draft picks
Dallas Wings players
Duke Blue Devils women's basketball players
Parade High School All-Americans (girls' basketball)
People from Cary, North Carolina
Power forwards (basketball)
Sportspeople from Providence, Rhode Island
UConn Huskies women's basketball players
Galatasaray S.K. (women's basketball) players